Start (Multi-Grain Start) was a breakfast cereal which was produced by Kellogg's in the UK from the mid-1980s until 2018. Start was promoted as a cereal designed for improving sports performance. It was made from wheat, corn and oats and a single bowlful was said to provide a third of a human's daily vitamin RDA. It was suitable for vegetarians but not for wheat allergy sufferers.

Product details
Vitamins and minerals:
 Carbohydrates – starch (53 g), sugar (69 g)
 Fat – 3.5 g (saturates 2 g)
 Fibre – 5 g
 Sodium – 0.4 g
 Vitamin B6 – 1.3 mg
 Vitamin B12 – 0.63 µg
 Vitamin D – 3.2 µg
 Folic acid – 250 µg
 Thiamin B1 – 0.9 mg
 Riboflavin B2 – 1.0 mg
 Niacin – 11.3 mg
 Iron – 8.8 mg

Advertising
The cereal has had a number of different advertising campaigns, with its most notable promoter being British athlete Steve Cram in the mid-1980s, with the slogan "I Want, Now I Can". Several also featured British Tour de France rider Robert Millar.

References

External links
 Product information at Kellogg's website

Kellogg's cereals